Here follows a list of notable alumni and faculty of Pitzer College.

Notable alumni

Anne Archer 1969, actress
Matthew Berkowitz, filmmaker
David Bloom 1985, anchor, NBC News
Max Brooks 1994, author and lecturer, son of Mel Brooks and Anne Bancroft
Dennis Cooper, novelist, poet, critic, and performance artist
John Darnielle 1995, novelist and lead singer of The Mountain Goats
Eric Douglas American actor and stand-up comedian, son of Kirk Douglas, brother of Michael Douglas
Mablean Ephriam '71, former prosecutor for the city of Los Angeles, television personality and actress
Kevin de León 2003, president of the California State Senate
Eli Erlick 2016, transgender activist, director of Trans Student Educational Resources
Susan Feniger 1976, celebrity chef and restaurateur
Tom Freund 1993, singer-songwriter and musician
Amy Gerstler 1978, poet and winner of the 1991 National Books Critics Circle Award for Bitter Angel
Steven González 1985, Chief Justice of the Washington State Supreme Court
Matthew Karatz 1994, deputy mayor of Los Angeles
John Landgraf 1984, FX Network president
J.Lately 2009, rapper
Dana Levin 1987, poet
Hunter Lovins, co-founder of Rocky Mountain Institute
Setha Low 1969, anthropologist, director of the Public Space Research Group
Charles Martinez, university administrator
Jonah Matranga 1991, singer-songwriter and musician, former frontman for Far and Gratitude.
Sandra Mitchell 1973, award-winning author, professor and philosopher of science
Sharon Monsky 1975, founder of the Scleroderma Research Foundation
Dee Mosbacher, documentary filmmaker, gay rights activist, and psychiatrist
Debbie Mucarsel-Powell, member of the U.S. House of Representatives from Florida's 26th district
Matt Nathanson 1995, singer-songwriter and musician
Ashwin Navin 1998, CEO of Sambaa. 
Fabian Núñez, former Speaker of the California State Assembly
Susan Patron 1969, children's author and winner of the 2007 Newbery Medal for The Higher Power of Lucky
Nick Simmons 2011, reality television personality, son of Gene Simmons and Shannon Tweed
Michael Simpson 1986, Grammy-Award-winning producer/composer; one half of the Dust Brothers
Rob Magnuson Smith 1991, author
Debra Wong Yang 1981, former United States Attorney for Central District of California; first Asian-American woman U.S. attorney

Notable faculty
Nigel Boyle, Political Studies – Expert in comparative politics, European social policy, labor market policy, Irish politics, soccer and politics. Recognized by the Fulbright Scholarship Board as the top Fulbright adviser.
Halford Fairchild, Psychology and Black Studies.
Stephen L. Glass, John A. McCarthy Professor Emeritus of Classics, longest-serving faculty member of the College from 1964-2011.
Judith Grabiner, Mathematics, history of mathematics and science. Awarded the 2014 Beckenback Book Prize for her book A Historian Looks Back: The Calculus as Algebra and Selected Writings (MAA Spectrum, 2010); Inaugural member of the 2012 Fellows of the American Mathematical Society.
David Moore, Psychology, Director of the Claremont Infant Study Center and winner of the American Psychological Association's 2016 Maccoby Book Award for The Developing Genome: An Introduction to Behavioral Epigenetics (2015).
 Gregg Popovich, men's basketball coach 1979-1986, 1987-1988.
 Dana Ward, Emeritus Professor of Political Studies - Founder of the Anarchy Archives, Executive Director of the International Society of Political Psychology (1998–2004).
 Kathleen Yep, Asian American Studies and Chair, Intercollegiate Department of Asian American Studies at The Claremont Colleges. Honored in 2015 for promoting literacy in the Los Angeles Community.
 Phil Zuckerman, Sociology and Secular Studies; expert in secularity, atheism, apostasy, and Scandinavian culture. Author of several books including Living the Secular Life (2014). Frequent contributor to the Huffington Post and sought after commentator for discussions on secularism by multiple media outlets.

References

Pitzer College people